Dimya maoria is a species of clam, a marine bivalve mollusk in the family Dimyidae.

References

 Powell A. W. B., New Zealand Mollusca, William Collins Publishers Ltd, Auckland, New Zealand 1979 

Dimyidae
Bivalves of New Zealand
Molluscs described in 1937